Van Thi Nguyen (born 1985/86) is a Vietnamese social entrepreneur and disability rights activist.

Early life
Born in a village  from Hanoi, Vân has spinal muscular atrophy, as did her brother Cong Hung Nguyen. She worried about their future, seeing the many disabled beggars in Vietnam, and became depressed, withdrawing from school and attempting suicide.

Career
Vân and Hung founded the Will to Live Center in 2003, which provides training for the disabled. Hung died, age 31, and Vân continued to run it alone.

Vân also runs Imagtor, a social enterprise which offers photo, video and IT solutions, employing many disabled Vietnamese.

In 2019, she was listed among the BBC's 100 Women, a list of 100 inspiring and influential women. She was also listed by Forbes Vietnam on a list of influential Vietnamese women in 2019.

References

Vietnamese women activists
Vietnamese disability rights activists
BBC 100 Women
21st-century Vietnamese women
People from Hanoi
Living people
People with spinal muscular atrophy
Year of birth missing (living people)